Maighread nighean Lachlainn (born c. 1660) was an eighteenth-century Scottish Gaelic poet from Mull. In her poetry, she mentions the Jacobite risings.

Poetry 
 Cha choma leam fhìn co dhiù sin (c. 1698)
 Dh' fhalbh mo chadal a' smaointinn
 Gaoir nam ban Muileach (1716): An Lasair, pg.60–71.
 Gun d' fhuair mi sgeul 's chan àicheam e
 Mo cheist an Leathanach mòdhar

References 

 Black, R. (ed.) 2001. An Lasair: An Anthology of Eighteenth-century Gaelic Verse  (Edinburgh: Birlinn)

External links 
 PhD thesis (University of Glasgow) by Anna Frater on Scottish Gaelic poetry written by women before 1750 (pdf)

1660s births

Year of birth uncertain
Date of birth uncertain
Year of death missing
17th-century Scottish poets
18th-century Scottish poets
17th-century Scottish women writers
17th-century writers
18th-century British women writers
17th-century Scottish Gaelic poets
Scottish women poets
People from the Isle of Mull
18th-century deaths
Scottish Gaelic women poets
Scottish Gaelic poets
18th-century Scottish Gaelic poets